Broadcast journalism is the field of news and journals which are broadcast by electronic methods instead of the older methods, such as printed newspapers and posters. It works on radio (via air, cable, and Internet), television (via air, cable, and Internet) and the World Wide Web. Such media disperse pictures (static and moving), visual text and sounds.

Description
Broadcast articles can be written as "packages", "readers", "voice-overs" (VO) and "sound on tape" (SOT).

A "sack" is an edited set of video clips for a news story and is common on television. It is typically narrated by a reporter. It is a story with audio, video, graphics and video effects. The news anchor, or presenter, usually reads a "lead-in" (introduction) before the package is aired and may conclude the story with additional information, called a "tag".

A "reader" is an article read without accompanying video or sound. Sometimes an "over the shoulder digital on-screen graphic" is added.

A voice-over, or VO, is a video article narrated by the anchor.

Sound on tape, or SOT, is sound or video usually recorded in the field. It is usually an interview or soundbite.

Radio was the first medium for broadcast journalism. Many of the first radio stations were co-operative community radio ventures not making a profit. Later, radio advertising to pay for programs was pioneered in radio. Later still, television displaced radio and newspapers as the main news sources for most of the public in industrialized countries.

Some of the programming on radio is locally produced and some is broadcast by a radio network, for example, by syndication. The "talent" (professional voices) talk to the audience, including reading the news. People tune in to hear engaging radio personalities, music, and information. In radio news, stories include speech soundbites, the recorded sounds of events themselves, and the anchor or host.

Some radio news might run for just four minutes, but contain 12–15 stories. These new bulletins must balance the desire for a broad overview of current events with the audience's limited capacity to focus on a large number of different stories.

The radio industry has undergone a radical consolidation of ownership, with fewer companies owning the thousands of stations.  Large media conglomerates such as Clear Channel Communications own most of the radio stations in the United States. That has resulted in more "niche" formats and the sharing of resources within clusters of stations, de-emphasizing local news and information. There has been concern over whether this concentration serves the public. The opposition says that the range of political views expressed is greatly narrowed and that local concerns are neglected, including local emergencies, for which communication is critical. Automation has resulted in many stations broadcasting for many hours a day with no one on the station premises.

History 
When radio first became popular, it was not used as a source of information; rather, people listened to the radio solely for entertainment purposes. This began to change with a man named Edward R. Murrow. Edward Murrow was an American who traveled to England in order to broadcast news about World War II. He stayed in London throughout the war and was the first to report on events such as bombings in London and updated the people on Hitler's reign. Murrow gained his fame mainly after reporting on Hitler's German army annexing Austria. Many Americans relied on his broadcasts throughout the war to gain information about the war.

More people also began to rely on radio for information after the attacks on Pearl Harbor. People found out about the bombing through President Roosevelt's broadcast interrupting their daily programming. It set Americans on edge, and people began to rely more heavily on the radio for major announcements throughout World War II. World War II was a time where radio broadcasting became a much larger industry because it was the easiest and quickest way for people to get updates on what was going on throughout the world.

Informative radio continued while television reporting also began to take flight. Throughout the 1940s and 1950s television news sources grew, but radio still dominated. It wasn't until John F. Kennedy's assassination in 1963 that television newscasting took off. Radio could only capture the sound of the event, but television showed people the true horror of the assassination. This was one of the first major events in which news companies competed with each other to get the news out to the public first. CBS News was the first to report that Kennedy had been shot and was killed. News crews spent the next several days covering everything happening in Washington, including Kennedy's funeral. This set the standard for news stations to have to cover major events quicker and get them out to the public as they were happening. The JFK assassination helped to transform television journalism to how it is today, with instantaneous coverage and live coverages at major events. Television offered faster coverage than radio and allowed viewers to feel more as if they were experiencing the event because they could visualize exactly what was going on.

NBC (National Broadcasting Company) and CBS (Columbia Broadcasting System) were the two competing forces of news broadcasting in the early years of broadcast journalism. NBC was established in 1926 and CBS in 1927. There was a divide in the industry because they were not only competing against each other, but radio news that had already been established.

Women had a hard time immersing themselves into radio news seeing as most of the radio broadcasts were men. There was a small number of women who hosted programs that were for homemakers and were on entertainment broadcast. After World War II, the doors for women in broadcasting opened up. This was also due to the shortage of men that were home during the war, so news outlets looked to women to fill those gaps of times.  In the 1960s and 1970s larger numbers of women began to enter into broadcast news field.

Both radio and television are major sources for broadcast journalism today, even with rapidly expanding technology. Television still focuses on covering major events, but radio broadcasts focus more on analyzing stories rather than reporting breaking news. Although the history of broadcast journalism has its origins in the early days of radio transmission, it is television with its attractive visuals and rapid dissemination that has empowered broadcast journalism to emerge as the most influential form of journalism until the rise of the Internet and the new forms of journalism associated with digital technologies. The internet often beats out broadcast journalism in terms of reporting breaking news, and the field of broadcast journalism is constantly having to adapt to the changing technology of today.

Television
Television (TV) news is considered by many to be the most influential medium for journalism. For most of the American public, local news and national TV newscasts are the primary news sources. Not only the numbers of audience viewers, but the effect on each viewer is considered more persuasive ("The medium is the message"). Television is dominated by attractive visuals (including beauty, action, and shock), with short soundbites and fast "cuts" (changes of camera angle). Television viewing numbers have become fragmented, with the introduction of cable news channels, such as Cable News Network (CNN), Fox News Channel and MSNBC.

Local television
The industry divides local television in North America into media markets. These television markets are defined by viewing area and are ranked by the number of audience viewers. New broadcast journalists generally start in the smaller markets with fewer viewers and move up to larger television stations and television networks after gaining experience. The larger stations usually have more resources and better pay.

United States stations typically broadcast local news three or four times a day: around 4:30–7 am (morning), 11:30 or noon (midday), 5 or 6 pm (evening), and 10 or 11 at night. Most of the nightly local newscasts are 30 minutes, and include sports coverage and weather. News anchors are shown sitting at a desk in a television studio. The news anchors read teleprompters that contain local interest stories and breaking news. Reporters frequently tell their stories outside the formal television studio in the field, in a remote broadcast setting where Electronic news-gathering (ENG) techniques are used with production trucks. Daytime television or morning shows include more "soft" news and feature pieces, while the evening news emphasizes "hard" news.

Education 
Many young journalists start out by learning about broadcast journalism through high school courses. They learn how to navigate the newsroom and equipment, and they learn the ethics and standards of journalism. Although learning the responsibilities of a journalist is important, education is required to work in broadcast journalism. A bachelor's degree in, "...journalism, broadcast journalism or interactive media," can lead to a career in broadcast production. However, a heavy amount of the education they receive is hands-on activity through internships and working for on-campus broadcasting stations. This real world view of the field combined with classes that teach students the ins and outs of writing, capturing video, interviewing and editing creates a developed and prepared journalist. Finding a job in the broadcasting field can be tough due to the decreased viewing and limited number of stations in each location, but the online media presence is causing employment to be, "...predicted to decline by 8% from 2014 to 2024."

News jobs
News anchors (formerly "anchormen") serve as masters-of-ceremonies and are usually shown facing a professional video camera in a television studio while reading unseen teleprompters. The anchors are often in pairs (co-anchors), who sit side by side and often alternate their reading. Meteorologists stand in front of chroma key backgrounds to describe weather forecasting and show maps, charts and pictures. Reporters research and write the stories and sometimes use video editing to prepare the story for air into a "package". Reporters are usually engaged in electronic field production (EFP) and are accompanied by a videographer at the scenes of the news; the latter holds the camera. The videographer or assistants manage the audio and lighting; they are in charge of setting up live television shots and might edit using a non-linear editing system (NLE). Segment producers choose, research and write stories, as well as deciding the timing and arrangement of the newscast. Associate producer, if any, specialize in other elements of the show such as graphics.

Production jobs

A newscast director is in charge of television show preparation, including assigning camera and talent (cast) positions on the set, as well as selecting the camera shots and other elements for either recorded or live television video production. The technical director (TD) operates the video switcher, which controls and mixes all the elements of the show. At smaller stations, the Director and Technical Director are the same person.

A graphics operator operates a character generator (CG) that produces the lower third on-screen titles and full-page digital on-screen graphics. The audio technician operates the audio mixing console. The technician is in charge of the microphones, music and audio tape. Often, production assistants operate the teleprompters and professional video cameras and serve as lighting and rigging technicians (grips).

Business changes 
Broadcast journalism is changing rapidly, causing issues within the business as well. Many people can no longer find jobs in broadcast journalism because much more is online and does not even need to be broadcast by a person. Others are being laid off to invest more money into new technologies. Other changes include innovations allowing TV stations to better alert viewers in emergencies and have higher quality services.

Online convergence
Convergence is the sharing and cross-promoting of content from a variety of media, all of which, in theory, converge and become one medium. In broadcast news, the internet is a key to convergence. Frequently, broadcast journalists also write text stories for the Web, usually accompanied by the graphics and sound of the original story. Websites offer the audience an interactive form where they can learn more about a story, can be referred to related articles, can offer comments for publication and can print stories at home. Technological convergence also lets newsrooms collaborate with other media, broadcast outlets sometimes have partnerships with their print counterparts.

Social media 
Citizen broadcast journalism is a new form of technology that has allowed regular civilians to post stories they see through outlets such as Snapchat, Facebook, and Twitter. It has become a new trend that some allegedly fear will take over broadcast journalism as it is known. News companies, like Fox News, are employing citizen journalists, which is a new phenomenon in journalism.

Fake news 
The terms "fake news" and "yellow journalism" have taken over broadcast journalism throughout the years. Its impact on broadcast journalism played a role in how news about the election was spread. Fake news defines how viewers see news that may be misleading or false. The main aim of yellow journalism is to gather the attention of people in the society.

See also

References

Further reading

 Portal to Nielsen Media DMA ranks 2007–2008 (archived 23 May 2009)
 Atmospheric Science Data Center – Meteorologist (archived 22 July 2012)

 
Television terminology
Broadcasting occupations